is a Japanese football player. He plays for Azul Claro Numazu.

Career
Takuya Fujiwara joined Japan Football League club Azul Claro Numazu in 2015.

Club statistics
Updated to 20 February 2017.

References

External links
Profile at Azul Claro Numazu

1992 births
Living people
Kanagawa University alumni
Association football people from Tokushima Prefecture
Japanese footballers
J3 League players
Japan Football League players
Azul Claro Numazu players
Association football defenders